Luba Skořepová (21 September 1923 – 23 December 2016) was a Czech actress. She appeared in more than 100 films and television shows between 1946 and 2015.

Selected filmography
 Arabela (1979, TV series)

References

External links

1923 births
2016 deaths
Czech film actresses
People from Náchod
20th-century Czech actresses
21st-century Czech actresses
Czech stage actresses
Czech television actresses
Prague Conservatory alumni